Eremanthe is a genus of moths of the family Crambidae. It contains only one species, Eremanthe chemsaki, Chemsak's desert moth, which is found in North America, where it has been recorded from California. It is also found in Mexico.

Adults are diurnal and are on wing from March to May.

References

Odontiini
Crambidae genera
Taxa named by Eugene G. Munroe